25 meter center-fire pistol is one of the ISSF shooting events, and is normally a men-only event. Its origin lies in competitions with military-style service pistols, and as such its history dates back to the 19th century.

25 meter pistol (formerly called sport pistol) is essentially the women's equivalent of this event, the only difference being the smaller rimfire caliber handguns used (often the same models only chambered for the smaller caliber).

Handguns

Caliber 
The name center-fire describes the type of cartridges used distinguishes this event from other ISSF events shot with handguns chambered for small caliber rimfire cartridges.

The rules specify that matches are to be shot with handgun of any caliber between 7.62 mm (.30) and 9.65 mm (.38), but the most popular cartridge is the .32 S&W Long Wadcutter, because it has good performance characteristics. Many countries also have laws restricting civilian ownership of firearms chambered for cartridges also used by military forces which would not apply to the rather obscure .32 S&W Long.

Type
Using a revolver is not a disadvantage because the "rapid-fire" stage is not as demanding or fast as the true rapid-fire event of 25 meter rapid fire pistol. The current record is set with a revolver (Toz 49). The most popular handgun choices, however, are larger caliber versions of rimfire semi-automatic pistols originally designed for 25 meter standard pistol. Many of these pistols can be changed from one caliber to the other by simply changing the barrel and magazine. Examples of such firearms are usually from companies specializing in firearms for ISSF events like Pardini Arms, Benelli, Morini, Walther and Hämmerli and include:
Hämmerli SP20
Pardini HP
Morini CM32M
Walther GSP
Benelli MP-90 and Benelli MP-95

Course of fire

A center-fire match consists of two parts of 30 shots each, both shot at 25 m:
 A precision stage where 5 shots are to be fired during a 5-minute period.
 A rapid-fire stage where, for each shot, the shooter has 3 seconds to raise his arm from a 45 degree angle and fire.
 As with all ISSF pistol disciplines, all firing must be done with one hand, unsupported.

The score zones of the targets are different for the two stages, but scores are usually similar for the two courses. In the precision stage, the target is the same as in 50 meter pistol (although at half the distance), with a 10-zone of 5 cm diameter, and in the rapid-fire stage, the target is the same as in 25 meter rapid fire pistol, with a 10-zone of 10 cm diameter.

Popularity
The event has not made it into the Olympic Games, and so gains little attention. It is part of the ISSF World Shooting Championships however, as well as the CISM World Championships. It is also notable for being the inspiration for the 25 meter pistol event, which is an Olympic event for women.

World Championships, Men

World Championships, Men Team

World Championships, total medals up to 2006

Current world records

World Champions

References 

ISSF shooting events
Handgun shooting sports